The commune of Gasorwe is a commune of Muyinga Province in northeastern Burundi. The capital lies at Gasorwe.

References

Communes of Burundi
Muyinga Province